György Czipott Slovene Juri Cipot, Prekmurje dialect Djürji Cipott (April 6, 1793 or April 1, 1794 – November 9, 1834) was a Slovenian Lutheran pastor, teacher, and writer in Hungary. His son Rudolf Czipott was a writer.

He was born in Černelavci, near Murska Sobota, or according to other sources in Puconci. He and his parents Miklós Czipott and Flóra Pekits soon moved to Polana.

Czipott studied at the Lutheran Lyceum of Sopron, and he was a curate in Körmend, and later in Legrad (Croatia). By 1821 he was serving in Hodoš, where he built a new church in 1823.

In 1829 he wrote his work Dühovni áldovi (Spiritual Blessings).

Czipott died in 1834. His successor in Puconci was the writer and poet János Kardos.

Works
 Dühovni áldovi ali molitvene knige Krszcsenikom na szrdcza i düse opravo i obeszeljávanye vu tuzni 'zitka vöraj. Szpravlene po Czípott Gyürji Evangelicsánszke Hodoske Fare Dühovniki. V. Sombathéli z Perger Ferentza píszkmi 1829.

See also
 List of Slovene writers and poets in Hungary
 Rudolf Czipott

References
 Muravidéki életrajzi lexikon
 Anton Trstenjak: Slovenci na Ogrskem Narodopisna in književna črtica, OBJAVA ARHIVSKIH VIROV, Maribor 2006.

Slovenian writers and poets in Hungary
Slovenian Lutheran clergy
1790s births
1834 deaths

People from the City Municipality of Murska Sobota